UGARIT is a submarine telecommunications cable system in the Mediterranean Sea linking Cyprus and Syria.

It has landing points in:
 Pentaskhinos, Cyprus
 Tartous, Syria

It has a design transmission capacity of 622 Mbit/s and a total cable length of 239 km.  It started operation on 6 February 1995.

Sources
 

Submarine communications cables in the Mediterranean Sea
1995 establishments in Cyprus
1995 establishments in Syria